Victor Grodås (born 9 December 1991) is a Norwegian footballer who plays for Kongsvinger .

He is the oldest son of Frode Grodås and his Swedish wife Maria, originally from Charlottenberg.

References

1991 births
Living people
People from Lillestrøm
Norwegian people of Swedish descent
Norwegian footballers
Norwegian First Division players
Eliteserien players
IL Hødd players
Sogndal Fotball players
Kristiansund BK players
Strømmen IF players
Kongsvinger IL Toppfotball players
Association football defenders
Sportspeople from Viken (county)